On the Threshold of Liberty (in French, Au seuil de la liberté) refers to two oil on canvas paintings by the Belgian surrealist René Magritte. The work depicts a large room with the walls paneled with different scenes or windows. Each panel reveals a different subject: a sky, fire, wood, a forest, the front of a building, an ornamental pattern, a female torso and a strange metallic texture featuring spherical bells (a common Magritte element). Inside the room is a cannon.

The original painting was completed in 1929 and is currently part of the collection at the Museum Boijmans Van Beuningen in Rotterdam. A second version was commissioned in 1937 by Magritte patron Edward James. For this version, the orientation was changed from horizontal to vertical leading to an increase in the area of the room depicted. It is currently on display at the Art Institute of Chicago.

In 1983 the American composer and trumpeter Mark Isham composed a piece of music titled after this painting. From 1996 through 2008, National Public Radio used Isham's composition as the background music for the annual Independence Day reading of the Declaration of Independence on the NPR program Morning Edition.

The Scottish 'Sound Explorer' Steve Moore released an album of the same title in 1982-84 as an exploration into 'Electroacoustic Surrealism'.

References

Paintings by René Magritte
Surrealist paintings
1929 paintings
1937 paintings
Paintings in the collection of the Art Institute of Chicago
Paintings in the collection of the Museum Boijmans Van Beuningen